Museo Francisco "Pancho" Coímbre (English: Francisco "Pancho" Coímbre Museum) is a sports museum in Ponce, Puerto Rico. Inaugurated on 21 January 1992, it is Puerto Rico's first sports museum.

History
The Francisco Pancho Coimbre Sports Museum was inaugurated on 21 January 1992. It was named after Ponce's own baseball great, Pancho Coímbre, who is considered "the most feared and productive Puerto Rican baseball batter of all times." The museum also acts as home to Ponce's Sports Hall of Fame. The museum is located on Lolita Tizol street, next to various other attractions, including the old Spanish military barracks.

On 12 January 2010, a new track and field gallery was inaugurated in memory of Juan "Papo" Franceschi, one of many heroes from the San Antón barrio.

Features
The museum is a one-room museum that houses a collection of photographs, documents and memorabilia regarding the early days of baseball in Puerto Rico, "back when professional players won only $5 per game and played the game during daylight hours only." Some of the names in the museum are not well known, such as Francisco “Pancho” Coimbre, Rafael “Rafaelito” Ortíz, or Emilio "Millito" Navarro, because they never played in the Major Leagues. However, they did serve as the source of inspiration for easily recognized figures such as Roberto Clemente.

Pancho Coimbre Museum also has displays about early women sport stars and racially divided baseball leagues. Among the interesting pieces of memorabilia is a uniform from Ponce's short-lived women's baseball team and a baseball bat that was the only object to survive the house fire that killed Coimbre.

Significance
The respect for Coimbre's natural talent, his ability to dominate the field with speed and strength and for bringing confidence and pride home to other Puerto Ricans and aspiring baseball players is evident in the museum.

"Coimbre began his career as an eager seventeen year old in 1926 and had landed a place in the New York Cubans. By the time he retired from professional baseball in 1951, he was the darling of every local in Ponce and they opened their hearts and gave support to the magnificent sportsman. He remained in the sports industry, and in Ponce, until his tragic death in 1989 when his home burnt to the ground."

References

External links

 Museo Francisco "Pancho" Coimbre

Museums in Ponce, Puerto Rico
Sports in Ponce, Puerto Rico
Baseball museums and halls of fame
Baseball in Puerto Rico
History museums in Puerto Rico
Art Deco architecture in Puerto Rico
Biographical museums in Puerto Rico
1992 establishments in Puerto Rico
Tourist attractions in Ponce, Puerto Rico
Museums established in 1992
Barrio Quinto
Sports museums in Puerto Rico